Ekaterina Borisovna Bukina (born May 5, 1987, in Angarsk) is a wrestler from Russia. She is a silver medalist in wrestling for Women's freestyle in the 75 kilogram range at the 2015 European Games in Baku.

In 2022, she competed in the women's 76 kg event at the Yasar Dogu Tournament held in Istanbul, Turkey.

References

External links
 
 
 

Living people
1987 births
Russian female sport wrestlers
European Games silver medalists for Russia
European Games medalists in wrestling
Wrestlers at the 2015 European Games
World Wrestling Championships medalists
People from Angarsk
Olympic wrestlers of Russia
Wrestlers at the 2016 Summer Olympics
Olympic bronze medalists for Russia
Olympic medalists in wrestling
Medalists at the 2016 Summer Olympics
Universiade medalists in wrestling
Universiade gold medalists for Russia
Medalists at the 2013 Summer Universiade
European Wrestling Champions
Sportspeople from Irkutsk Oblast
21st-century Russian women